Alcian yellow is an azo dye with the formula (CH3[(CH3N)2CS]2C6H2SNCC6H4)2N2. Its structure consists of a largely conjugated array of benzene, benzothiazole and isothiouronium units.

Histological Use 
Alcian yellow is used in histology in conjunction with toluidine blue to help visualize H. pylori.  The resulting structures are stained as follows:

– Mucin: yellow

– H. pylori: blue

– Other cellular components/background: shades of blue

See also 
 Alcian blue stain

References 

Azo dyes
Benzothiazoles